Connecticut wine refers to wine made from grapes and other fruit grown in the U.S. state of Connecticut.  The modern wine industry in Connecticut began with the passage of the Connecticut Winery Act in 1978.  The wineries in Connecticut are located throughout the state, including in the three designated American Viticultural Areas in the state.  The climate in the coastal region near Long Island Sound and the Connecticut River valley tends to be warmer than the highlands in the eastern and western sides of the state.

Connecticut Wine Trail

The Connecticut Wine Trail is a route linking approved wineries located in the state of Connecticut. As of 2015, there are 33 wineries on the trail. Members of the CT Wine Trail participate with other Connecticut farm wineries in the Passport to  Connecticut Farm Wineries sponsored by the Connecticut Farm Wine Development Council and the Connecticut Department of Agriculture.

Sherman P. Haight Jr. of Haight Vineyard in Litchfield conceived of the idea of the wine trail in 1988. It was officially dedicated by the state in 1992 with five wineries.

See also

 List of wineries in New England

References

External links
 Connecticut Wine Trail - Taste the Adventure

 
Wine regions of the United States by state